Honeymoon Bay may refer to:
 Honeymoon Bay, British Columbia
 Honeymoon Bay, Yilan
 Honeymoon Bay, Tasmania
 Honeymoon Bay, U.S. Virgin Islands, labeled Druif Bay on nautical charts.